Yakov Andreyevich Eshpai (Kokshamary – 20 February 1963, Moscow) was a Russian composer and music teacher. He studied under Georgi Conus at the Moscow Conservatory. He was ethnic Mari.  He is partly noted for his work concerning the folk music of the Mari people. He was the father of the better-known composer Andrei Eshpai, and the grandfather of the filmmaker Andrei Andreyevich Eshpai.

References

1890 births
1963 deaths
People from Zvenigovsky District
People from Cheboksarsky Uyezd
Mari people
Soviet composers
Soviet male composers
20th-century composers
20th-century Russian male musicians
Moscow Conservatory alumni